The 26th Miss Chinese International Pageant, Miss Chinese International Pageant 2015 was held on January 25, 2015. Miss Chinese International 2014 Grace Chan of Hong Kong crowned her successor, Mandy Chai of Sydney, Australia at the end of the pageant.

Pageant information
The slogan to this year's pageant was "Delicate and Stunning, Chasing the Dream of Beauty" 「玲瓏絕色 唯美追夢」.  The masters of ceremony this year were Carol Cheng, Lawrence Cheng, and Janis Chan. Judges included actor Roger Kwok, Miss Hong Kong 1989 Monica Chan, and Miss Hong Kong 1991 Second Runner-Up Ada Choi.

The show also included two guest judging panels that provided their Top 3 Picks throughout the evening.  However, their choices are not scored and therefore are not included in the official results.  The two panels include the 20-person "Star Judging Panel" that consists of TVB artistes, and a 100-person "Professional Panel" that consists of professionals from the banking, insurance, production, entrepreneurship, fashion, and cosmetic sectors.  In addition, the 18 competing delegates also provided with their choices for Top 3, that were announced near the beginning of the programme.

Results

Special awards

Guest panels Top 3 choices

Delegates' choices

Professional Panel's choices

Star Panel's choices

Judges
Roger Kwok - Actor
Monica Chan - Miss Hong Kong 1989, Miss Chinese International Pageant 1989 First Runner-up
Ada Choi - Actor, Miss Hong Kong 1991 Second Runner-Up
Dr. Eddy Li - Council Member, 11th Chinese People's Political Consultative Conference
Clement Chan - Past President, Hong Kong Institute of Certified Public Accountants

Contestant list

References

External links
 Miss Chinese International Pageant 2015 Official Site

TVB
Chinese International Pageant
Beauty pageants in Hong Kong
Miss Chinese International Pageants
2015 in Hong Kong